The Encyclopedia of the Afghan Jihad (Arabic: موسوعة الجهاد الأفغاني, tr: Mawsuat al-Jihad al-Afghani) is a multivolume encyclopedia describing diverse weapons in Arabic. It was first published in Pakistan in late 1992 or early 1993. The encyclopedia consists of more than 8,000 pages—an abridged version has been reduced to approximately 1,000 pages—and has been divided into 11 volumes.

An electronic version of the original, full-length encyclopedia was discovered in the possession of a group of Muslim militants in Belgium in the 1990s. Since then, several copies have been found; one was found in the possession of Abu Hamza al-Masri, a Muslim cleric who controlled the Finsbury Park Mosque in London, and another was recovered from Osama bin Laden's headquarters in Kandahar.

Outline 
The first volume deals with explosives, the second with first aid, and the last volume teaches the use of small arms, including anti-aircraft guns, anti-tank arms, and artillery. such as:

 Explosives
 First aid 
 Pistols, revolvers 
 Bombs, mines 
 Security intelligence 
 Tactics practiced 
 Weapons 
 Tanks 
 Close fighting 
 Topography area survey 
 Armament

References

Works by al-Qaeda
Terrorism handbooks and manuals